Kim Bo-reum (Hangul: 김보름, born 6 February 1993) is a South Korean speed skater. She is the current South Korean record holder in the women's long track speed skating 3000 and 5000 metres. She is a two-time Olympian and specialises in the women's mass start.

Speed skating career
Kim started short track speed skating as a child. In 2007, at the age of 14, she was selected for the South Korean national junior team and won the gold medal in the women's 2000-metre relay at the Asian Junior Short Track Speed Skating Championships. At the end of April 2010, however, Kim turned to long track speed skating after being inspired by compatriot Lee Seung-hoon, who had similarly switched formats and medalled at the 2010 Winter Olympics. She won her first major medal at the 2011 Asian Winter Games, with a silver in the women's 3000 metres and placed fourth in the women's 5000 metres.

At the 2013 World Single Distance Speed Skating Championships, Kim won bronze in the women's team pursuit with Noh Seon-yeong and Park Do-yeong. She also placed 11th in the women's 1500 metres and 9th in the women's 3000 metres. Later that year, she participated at the 2013 Winter Universiade, winning gold in the women's 1500 metres and women's team pursuit (with Park Do-yeong and Yang Shin-young), as well as silver in the women's 3000 metres and women's 5000 metres.

Kim participated in the Olympics for the first time during the 2014 Winter Olympics, in which she ranked 13th place at the women's 3000 metres and 21st place at the women's 1500 metres Along with Noh Seon-yeong and Yang Shin-young, Kim was also part of the South Korean team which participated in the quarter-finals of the women's team pursuit. She tore her anterior cruciate ligament during the women's 5000 metres event, which limited her appearances for the rest of the season.

After the underwhelming performance at the 2015 World Championships due to the injury, Kim came back with a new national record of 7:05.55 for the women's 5000 metres during the 2015–16 ISU Speed Skating World Cup. At the 2016 World Championships, Kim won silver in the women's mass start and placed 7th in the women's 3000 metres. She bettered that result at the 2017 World Championships by winning gold in the women's mass start and placing 6th in the women's 3000 metres with a new national record time of 4:03.85. She was also part of the South Korean women's team pursuit team with Noh Seon-yeong and Park Ji-woo, which finished 5th. At the 2017 Asian Winter Games, Kim won gold in the women's 5000 metres, silver in the women's 3000 metres and the women's team pursuit, and a bronze in the women's mass start.

During the 2018 Winter Olympics, the Winter Olympic games that were held in her home country South Korea for the first time, Kim won the silver medal at the women's mass start in speed skating, which was her first ever medal from the Olympics. She also participated in the women's 3000 metres event.

After failing to advance to the semi-finals of the women's team pursuit in the 2018 Olympics, Kim received public backlash after her interview, which seemingly attributed the team's loss to her teammate Noh Seon-yeong. She later made a public apology. Although Noh proceeded to claim that she was the victim of Kim's bullying, which hugely intensified the public anger against Kim, the subsequent lawsuit revealed that Kim was the actual victim who had been constantly bullied by Noh. Kim later recalled in 2022 that what hurt the most was being accused as a bully when she was the victim.

Kim again represented South Korea in the women's mass start in the 2022 Olympics, finishing 5th in the final. After the match, expressing her happiness to be back in the Olympics; Kim cried during the interview and expressed that she could keep going on due to the support from many people despite her worry that no one would cheer for her after the incident.

In May 2022, Kim signed with Bonbu ENT, an entertainment agency. She plans to debut in the entertainment industry.

Personal records

Filmography

Television show

References

External links

1993 births
Living people
Sportspeople from Daegu
South Korean female speed skaters
South Korean female short track speed skaters
Speed skaters at the 2014 Winter Olympics
Speed skaters at the 2018 Winter Olympics
Speed skaters at the 2022 Winter Olympics
Olympic speed skaters of South Korea
Speed skaters at the 2011 Asian Winter Games
Speed skaters at the 2017 Asian Winter Games
Asian Games medalists in speed skating
Asian Games gold medalists for South Korea
Asian Games silver medalists for South Korea
Asian Games bronze medalists for South Korea
Medalists at the 2011 Asian Winter Games
Medalists at the 2017 Asian Winter Games
Universiade medalists in speed skating
Medalists at the 2018 Winter Olympics
Olympic medalists in speed skating
Olympic silver medalists for South Korea
World Single Distances Speed Skating Championships medalists
Universiade medalists in short track speed skating
Universiade gold medalists for South Korea
Universiade silver medalists for South Korea
Competitors at the 2013 Winter Universiade